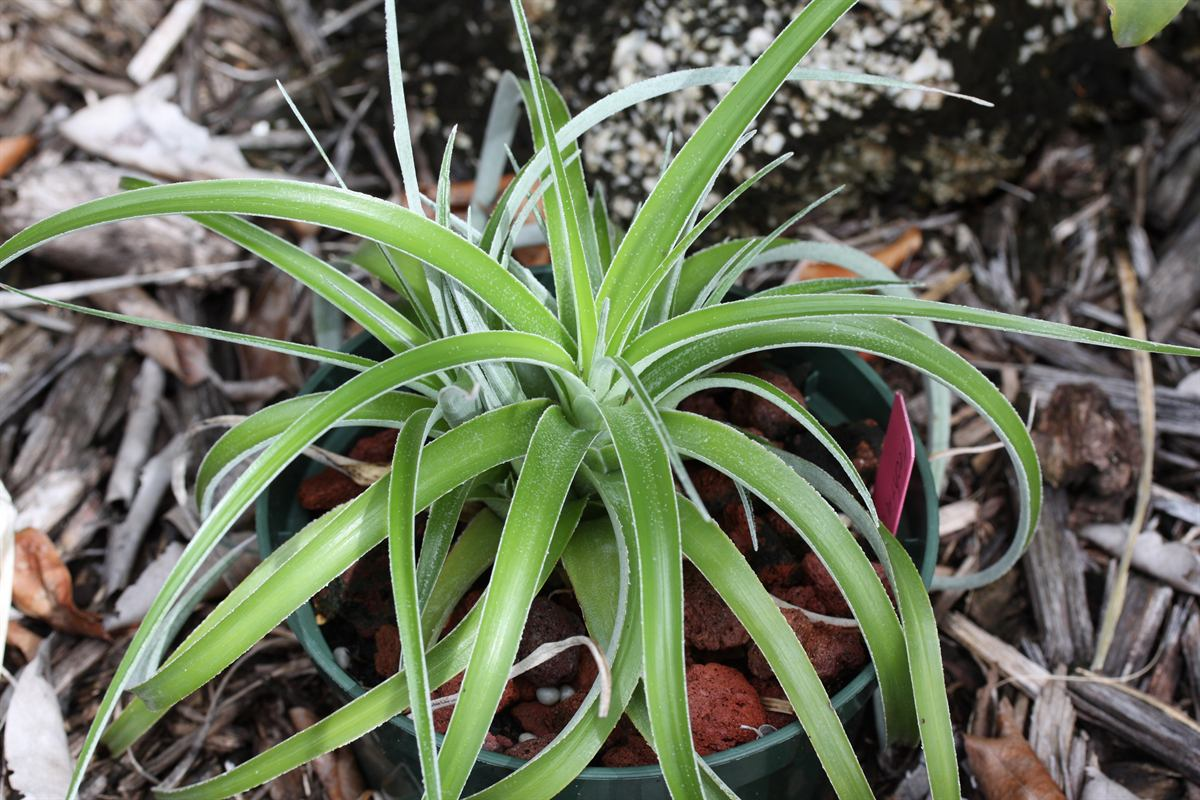

Scientific classification
- Kingdom: Plantae
- Clade: Tracheophytes
- Clade: Angiosperms
- Clade: Monocots
- Clade: Commelinids
- Order: Poales
- Family: Bromeliaceae
- Genus: Bakerantha
- Species: B. caerulea

Binomial name
- Bakerantha caerulea (Matuda) I.Ramírez & K.Romero

Synonyms
- Hechtia caerulea (Matuda) L.B.Sm.; Hechtia integerrima M.B.Foster; Niveophyllum caeruleum Matuda

= Bakerantha caerulea =

Species of flowering plant

Bakerantha caerulea is a species of plant in the family Bromeliaceae. It is endemic to Mexico.
